Claude Murray Ross (13 May 1893 – 17 August 1917) was an Australian track and field athlete. Ross competed in the men's 400 metres hurdles for Australasia at the 1912 Summer Olympics.

In 1914, Ross from Victoria enlisted in the Field Artillery
Brigade of the 1st Division, First Australian Imperial Force. In 1915, Ross was at both the April landing and December evacuation of the Gallipoli Campaign. In early 1917, he gained his commission in the Royal Flying Corps. Ross was killed on 17 August 1917 aged 24 in the skies over France.

See also
 List of Olympians killed in World War I

References

External links
Olympic profile

1893 births
1917 deaths
Olympic athletes of Australasia
Athletes (track and field) at the 1912 Summer Olympics
Australian male hurdlers
Australian military personnel killed in World War I
Royal Flying Corps officers
19th-century Australian people
20th-century Australian people